History of Guns are an English cross-genre group combining elements of industrial, punk, electronica, goth, edm, rock, metal and avant-garde from Hertfordshire, England.  The current members are Del Alien, Max Rael and Jamu.

Their name comes from the title of one of their earliest songs, written about the Dunblane massacre.

Primarily a studio project, History of Guns played live sporadically throughout their career including the Whitby Gothic Weekend and both Futurepunk23 and Back to the Futurepunk.

They contributed the track Jezebel and the Philistines to the debut album The Excommunication of Christ by The Meads of Asphodel in 2001, and further contributed to their subsequent releases Jihad / Freezing Moon (2002), Exhuming the Grave of Yeshua (2003) and Damascus Steel (2005). (credited as either History Of Guns or Max Rael).

In 2007, their song Your Obedient Servants came in at no.19 in journalist Mick Mercer's list of Top 30 Goth Singles of All Time.

In April 2008, Line Out Records sponsored the Whitby Gothic Weekend bi-annual football tournament so teams were competing for, 'The History of Guns – Acedia Challenge Cup'.

Their third album ACEDIA was released on 7 July 2008 on Line Out Records and was awarded 9/10 by Rock Sound on 3 July 2008.

A reaction against the relentless miserablism of Acedia, History of Guns followed it up with The Spice Girls EP in April 2009. A light-hearted, three-song investigation into The Spice Girls, including the track "Slice Up Your Wife".

Their latest release was Whatever You Do, Don't Turn Up at Twelve, released on Zero State Media / Line Out Records on 21 October 2011.

In August 2015 they were featured in the Beautiful Noise exhibition at Hertford Museum of notable bands from the area.

History

Phase One: Beginning (1996–1999)
History of Guns was formed in February 1996 as 'Pre-Hate Machine' by Stagger Lee with Max Rael and Del Alien.  Del Alien renamed the band 'History of Guns' after a song he had written about the Dunblane Massacre in mid 1996.

Their first demo Reformation Day was recorded in a day at Discipline Studios in Tottenham in July 1996. In September 1996 Gary 'The Reverend' Hughes joined the band as a regular part-time collaborator. The band signed up with Top Knotch Management in 1997 and recorded a second demo Sold on Secrets in Chelmsford. In 1999, the band acquired a PC, and began recording with Cubase.

The first track recorded in this fashion was "Random Death Bag" which appeared on the third instalment of the No Holy Additive compilation CD from Godreah Zine, followed by the Little Miss Suicide EP which was released on the newly formed Liquid Len record label, and an unreleased demo album called 'Enough Is Too Much LP'. Stagger Lee quit the band with the release of their first CD, Little Miss Suicide EP in 1999.

Phase Two: Liquid Len Records (2001–2006)
In 2001, Godreah zine contacted the band with a request for them to appear on the fourth and final instalment of the No Holy Additive compilation CD. Del Alien and Max Rael recorded their first new material for two years, namely, Reconstructing Terror, Fact and Disconnect, they also completed two unfinished tracks left over from Enough Is Too Much sessions namely, 57 Days and Burn, which eventually got released as the Disconnect EP by the Liquid Len record label in 2002.

Kevin Gerrish joined the band briefly in 2002 during the writing and recording of The Mirror Pond LP.   Weeks before its release History of Guns issued a press released saying that they'd been "consumed by business rhetoric" and were thus "downsizing the album into an EP". Although many of the remaining tracks remain unreleased, the track 'Psycho' was included as a bonus track on the second edition of the CD, and 'Sunday Lunchtime (A Family Portrait)' and 'Soaked' were included on the 2007 release 'Issue Six:Archive One – Make It Look Like An Accident'.

History of Guns released their debut album Flashes of Light LP in 2004. A dense slab of atmospheric dark electronica devoid of any guitars, noted for its unusual structure of having two long opening songs, four short middle songs, then two long closing songs.

Recruiting a live band in 2004 History of Guns performed gigs around the south east of England as an edgy punk band, not performing any of the songs from their debut album.  The last date was filmed and released on DVD as "Twenty Seven Paces".

Their second album APOPHENIA was released in November 2005.  It was named after the medical condition of seeing patterns in seemingly random data, Apophenia. This time the album was structured in two distinct halves, and every track on the album written and performed in a different genre.

Responding to an interview with Dark Futures zine in which History of Guns said they worked very quickly, to which the interviewer replied "how did it take two years to make your new album then?" History of Guns announced a series of free limited edition bi-monthly CDs, starting with the March 2006 release UDDERS available via their website.

In April 2006, they played their debut at the Whitby Gothic Weekend. In November 2006, the band announced that they had signed to Line Out Records and would no longer be able to keep to their schedule of releasing a new EP every other month whilst they wrote and recorded their third album to be titled ACEDIA.

Phase Three: Line Out Records (2007 – present) 
History of Guns' third album ACEDIA was released on 7 July 2008 on Line Out Records.  The album title came from the lyrics to Of Walking Abortion by Manic Street Preachers from their The Holy Bible album
The inside sleeve artwork features a copy of No Longer Human by Osamu Dazai. Downwithfreedom.com provided an animated music video for the track 'Exhaust Fumes' which appeared on YouTube in October 2008.

In July 2009, History of Guns released a three track EP focussing on The Spice Girls, featuring Slice Up Your Wife which incorporated elements of the original Spice Girls song Spice Up Your Life described by The Dreaded Press as "a sub-three-minute slice of staggering satire and vengeful rage" On 21 October that year, the band released their fourth album, Whatever You Do, Don't Turn Up at Twelve.

Former/past member(s)
Fester: Guitar (2004–2007)
Stagger Lee: bass guitar (1996–1999)
Kevin Gerrish: bass guitar (2002)
Goose: bass guitar (on and off 2003–2006)

Discography

Studio releases
 Little Miss Suicide EP (1999)	
 Disconnect EP (2002)	
 The Mirror Pond EP (2003)	
 Flashes of Light LP (2004)	
 Apophenia (2006)
 Acedia (2008)
 Whatever You Do, Don't Turn Up at Twelve (2011)
 Forever Dying in Your Eyes (2022)
 Half Light (tbc)

Free release series
Apospemia - A Collection of B-sides LENCD10, 2005	
Issue One - UDDERS Free CD EP, March 2006
Issue Two - ELECTRICITY IS THE ANSWER Free CD EP, May 2006
Issue Three - POKER FACE Free CD EP, July 2006
Issue Four - Whitby October 2006 Promo Free CD EP, October 2006
Issue Five - All The Natural Beauty of a Golf Course Free CD EP, April 2007
Issue Six - Make It Look Like An Accident : ARCHIVE ONE Free CD EP, October 2007
Empty Eyes (single mix)/Killing Myself Until I Die (excerpt) Free CD single, April 2008
Empty Eyes / ...But I'll Be Waiting Free CD/download single, August 2008
It's Easy (To Go Blind) *alternate version* / Exhaust Fumes *remix* Free CD/download single, October 2008
The Spice Girls EP Free CD/download EP, April 2009
 Vol2Iss1: Never More Alive Than on the Eve of Death Free download, ZSM012, July 2012
 Vol2Iss2: Guns at Dawn Free download, ZSM018, April 2013

DVDs
Twenty Seven Paces LENDVD1 2005

Demos
Reformation Day Demo, 1996
Sold on Secrets Demo, 1997
Enough Is Too Much Demo Album, 1999

Compilations
Contains no Holy Additives Vol.2, Godreah Records, 1999
Contains no Holy Additives Vol.3, Godreah Records, 2000
Contains no Holy Additives Vol.4, FAFF03, Godreah Records, 2001
Tribal Sin, 2001
Daze of the Underground, 2003
DarkCell 01, 2003
This Is Industrial Punk, 2005
Line Out & Chums Vol. 1, 2006
Lined Up vol. 1, 2007
This Is Industrial Punk Vol.2, 2010

Remixes
(as Remixing artists)

Fish (ex-Marillion) – 3 History of Guns remixes included on the Fellini Days Companion CD, 2001	
Jo McCafferty – Vanessa – Raelism Remix 2002 (unreleased)
Xykogen –  Mutate And Survive – History of Guns Remix 2006
Psychophile – All in the Mind – History of Guns Remix 2006
Reincarnation Fish – Homeless Samurai – History of Guns, The Farmers Have Won Mix 2007
Xykogen – Terminology – History of Guns Remix 2007

(as artists being Remixed)
 LMS – Track Little Miss Suicide Remixed by Gary Hughes 2001
 Spoonburn – Track Moonburn remixed by Daniel Vincent (of Karma Pilot) 2004
 Blown Out – Track Blown remixed by The Resonance Association vs History of Guns 2007

References

External links
 Official Homepage
 Liquid Len Records
 Max Rael's blog
 Max Rael's solo work
 Reviews of four History of Guns releases

British electronic music groups
English rock music groups
British experimental musical groups
British industrial music groups
Musical groups from London